Ponshewaing is an unincorporated community and census-designated place (CDP) in Emmet County in the U.S. state of Michigan. As of the 2010 census, the CDP had a population of 69.  It is located within Littlefield Township.

Geography
Ponshewaing is located in southeastern Emmet County, in Littlefield Township, on the north shore of Crooked Lake. It is bordered to the west by Oden. U.S. Route 31 passes through the community, leading southwest  to Petoskey, the county seat, and northeast  to Alanson.

The community of Ponshewaing was listed as a newly-organized census-designated place for the 2010 census, meaning it now has officially defined boundaries and population statistics for the first time.

Of Michigan's 159 census-designated places, Ponshewaing ranks as the smallest in terms of land area and fourth smallest in terms of population.

Education
Its school district is Alanson Public Schools.

Demographics

References 

Unincorporated communities in Michigan
Unincorporated communities in Emmet County, Michigan
Census-designated places in Emmet County, Michigan
Census-designated places in Michigan